Statistics of Nemzeti Bajnokság I in the 1952 season.

Overview
It was contested by 14 teams, and Budapest Honvéd FC won the championship.

League standings

Results

Statistical leaders

Top goalscorers

References
Hungary - List of final tables (RSSSF)

Nemzeti Bajnokság I seasons
1951–52 in Hungarian football
1952–53 in Hungarian football
Hun
Hun